Louis-Léon Lesieur Désaulniers (February 20, 1823 – October 31, 1896) was a Quebec physician and political figure. He represented Saint-Maurice in the House of Commons of Canada as a Conservative member from 1867 to 1868 and from 1879 to 1887.

He was born in Yamachiche, Lower Canada in 1823, the son of François Lesieur Desaulniers, who represented Saint-Maurice in the legislative assemblies for Lower Canada and the Province of Canada. He studied at the Séminaire de Nicolet, then went on to study medicine, first at Trois-Rivières and then at Harvard University, graduating in 1846. He returned to practice in Yamachiche.  He was elected to represent Saint-Maurice in the Legislative Assembly of Canada in 1854, 1858 and 1861 as a member of the parti bleu, then was defeated in 1863. He was elected to the 1st Canadian Parliament in 1867 but resigned in 1868 to become inspector for prisons and asylums in Quebec, later serving as president of that agency. Desaulniers also was an officer in the local militia. He died in Montreal in 1896.

His son Eugène Merrill was later a member of the Legislative Assembly of Quebec.

Electoral record

Saint Maurice, 1867–1886

References

 

1823 births
1896 deaths
Harvard Medical School alumni
Conservative Party of Canada (1867–1942) MPs
Members of the Legislative Assembly of the Province of Canada from Canada East
Members of the House of Commons of Canada from Quebec